Mafia Commission may refer to:

Sicilian Mafia Commission
The Commission (American Mafia) 
Mafia Commission Trial